This is a list of films set on or around Valentine's Day.

Animated
 A Charlie Brown Valentine - a 2002 animated TV special based on the comic strip Peanuts
 A Special Valentine with the Family Circus - a 1978 animated TV special based on the comic strip The Family Circus
 A Valentine for You - a 1999 TV special based on the Disney television series The New Adventures of Winnie the Pooh
 Be My Valentine, Charlie Brown - a 1975 animated TV special based on the comic strip Peanuts
 Bugs Bunny's Valentine - a 1979 special featuring clips from classic Looney Tunes cartoon shorts
 I Love the Chipmunks - Valentine Special - a 1984 TV special featuring Alvin and the Chipmunks
 Madly Madagascar - a 2013 animated direct-to-DVD special
 The Muppets' Valentine Special - a 1976 variety pilot to "The Muppet Show"
 A Scooby-Doo Valentine - a 2002 television special based on the show What's New Scooby-Doo?
 The Berenstain Bears' Comic Valentine
 The Pink Panther in: Pink at First Sight
 The Valentine's Day That Almost Wasn't - a 1982 HBO special produced by Paul Fusco

Comedy
 I Hate Valentine's Day - a 2009 romantic comedy written and directed by Nia Vardalos
 Obvious Child - a 2014 romantic comedy
 The Old Maid's Valentine - a 1900 short romantic comedy directed by George Albert Smith
 Sleepless in Seattle - a 1993 romantic comedy starring Tom Hanks and Meg Ryan
 Valentine's Day - a 2007 comedy TV special made by the Australian Broadcasting Corporation
 Valentine's Day - a 2010 romantic comedy directed by Garry Marshall

Crime
 The St. Valentine's Day Massacre - a 1967 dramatization directed by Roger Corman

Drama
 Eternal Sunshine of the Spotless Mind - a 2004 romantic drama written by Charlie Kauffman and directed by Michel Gondry
 An Affair to Remember - a 1957 drama starring Cary Grant and Deborah Kerr

Horror
 Hospital Massacre - a 1982 horror film also known as Be My Valentine, or Else...
 My Bloody Valentine - a 1981 slasher film directed by George Mihalka
 My Bloody Valentine 3D - a 2009 remake of the 1981 film
 Valentine - a 2001 slasher film, directed by Jamie Blanks
 Overnight Delivery - a 1998 comedy film

Mystery
 Picnic at Hanging Rock - a 1975 mystery drama directed by Peter Weir

See also
 List of Valentine's Day television specials
 :Category:Valentine's Day television episodes

Lists of films set around holidays